The town of Otlatepec, also known as Agua del Padre is located in the Municipality of Tlalchapa in the Mexican state of Guerrero.

Demography
As of 2000, Otlatepec had 697 inhabitants, 336 of them were males and 361 of them females. In 2005 there were 965 residents.

Education
Otlatepec features a kindergarten "La Luz del Saber", a rural primary school, "Corregidora De Queretaro", and a secondary school, "Primer Congreso de Anahuac".

References

Populated places in Guerrero